In enzymology, a formate—dihydrofolate ligase is an enzyme that catalyzes the chemical reaction

ATP + formate + dihydrofolate  ADP + phosphate + 10-formyldihydrofolate

The 3 substrates of this enzyme are ATP, formate, and dihydrofolate, whereas its 3 products are ADP, phosphate, and 10-formyldihydrofolate.

This enzyme belongs to the family of ligases, specifically those forming generic carbon-nitrogen bonds.  The systematic name of this enzyme class is formate:dihydrofolate ligase (ADP-forming).

References

Further reading 

 

EC 6.3.4
Enzymes of unknown structure